is a city in Kamikawa Subprefecture, Hokkaido, Japan. It is the capital of the subprefecture, and the second-largest city in Hokkaido, after Sapporo. It has been a core city since April 1, 2000. The city is currently well known for the Asahiyama Zoo , the Asahikawa ramen and a Ski resort city. On July 31, 2011, the city had an estimated population of 352,105, with 173,961 households, and a population density of 470.96 persons per km² (1,219.8 persons per sq. mi.).

Asahikawa joined UNESCO's Network of Creative Cities as a Design City on October 31, 2019 on the occasion of World Cities’ Day.

Overview
 

On August 1, 1922, Asahikawa was founded as Asahikawa City. As the central city in northern Hokkaido, Asahikawa has been influential in industry and commerce. There are about 130 rivers and streams including the Ishikari River and Chūbetsu River, and over 740 bridges in the city. Asahibashi, a bridge over Ishikari River, has been one of the symbols of Asahikawa since its completion in 1932, and it was also registered as one of the Hokkaido Heritage sites on October 22, 2001.

Every winter, the Asahikawa Winter Festival is held on the bank of the Ishikari River, making use of Asahikawa's cold climate and snow. On January 25, 1902, a weather station recorded , the lowest temperature in Japanese history. Due to its climate and location surrounded by mountains, there are some ski resorts in the outskirts of the city.

Name
The Ainu called the Asahi River Chiu Pet meaning "River of Waves", but it was misunderstood as Chup Pet, meaning "Sun River", and so it came to be called Asahi River in Japanese (Asahi meaning "morning sun").

History 

Asahikawa was populated by the mainland Japanese in the Meiji period (1868 – July 1912) as a tondenhei, or state-sponsored farmer-militia settlement.

Kamikawa District set up under Ishikari Province with the villages of Asahikawa, Nagayama and Kamui in 1890.
1900 Asahikawa Village becomes Asahikawa town
1914 Asahikawa Town becomes Asahikawa-ku

Asahikawa was elevated to city status in 1922.

Asahikawa thrived as a military city before World War II, when the IJA 7th Division was posted there. During the closing stages of the war, Asahikawa was bombed by American naval aircraft in July 1945. Today, the 2nd Division of the Northern Army of the Japan Ground Self-Defense Force is headquartered in Asahikawa.

1955 Kamui Village and Etanbetsu Village merge with Asahikawa
1961 Nagayama Town merged
1963 Higashi-Asahikawa Town merged
1967 Asahiyama Zoo opened
1968 Kagura Town merged
1971 Higashi-Takasu Town merged
1972 Japan's first permanent pedestrian mall Heiwadōri Shopping Park opened
April 1, 2000 Asahikawa becomes a core city

Geography

Climate 
The climate is hemiboreal humid continental (Dfb, according to Köppen classification). Asahikawa winters are long and cold, with below-freezing average monthly temperatures from November through March. The city also sees an extraordinary amount of snowfall, averaging just under  of snow per year. Spring and autumn are generally short and transitional in the city. 

It is one of the coldest Japanese cities as well as one of the most "continental". Japan's lowest temperature ever was recorded in Asahikawa, colder than other cities registered in Hokkaido, but warmer in absolute numbers than Mount Fuji. On January 12, 1909 the temperature did not rise above , being one of the coldest in history. Some sources consider it the coldest city in Japan.

Economy

Asahikawa developed as an industrial center in Hokkaido after World War II. The city is noted for its lumber and brewing industries, as well as the production of furniture and paper pulp.

Education

Universities

National
 Asahikawa Medical University
 Hokkaido University of Education, Asahikawa Campus

Private
 Asahikawa University
 Tokai University (Previously: the Asahikawa Campus of Hokkaido Tokai University)

Colleges
 Asahikawa National College of Technology

High schools

Public
 Hokkaido Asahikawa Higashi High school
 Hokkaido Asahikawa Kita High School
 Hokkaido Asahikawa Nishi High School
 Hokkaido Asahikawa Minami High School
 Hokkaido Asahikawa Eiryo High school
 Hokkaido Asahikawa Agricultural High School (Nogyo)
 Hokkaido Asahikawa Commercial High School (Shogyo)
 Hokkaido Asahikawa Technical High School (Kogyo)

Private
 Asahikawa Ryukoku High School
 Asahikawa Fuji Girls' High School
 Asahikawa Jitsugyo High School
 Asahikawa Meisei High School
 Asahikawa University High School
 Ikegami Gakuen High School, Asahikawa Campus
 Asahikawa Tosei High School

Transportation

Airport
Asahikawa is served by Asahikawa Airport which stretches over the outskirts of Asahikawa City and Higashikagura, Hokkaido. The airport was first proposed by the Asahikawa City Council in 1955, opened in 1961, and daily flights to Tokyo started in 1970. The present terminal of Asahikawa Airport opened in 2000. It is a second class airport, and also a single-runway regional airport. It serves domestic destinations including Tokyo, but some airlines offer destinations in South Korea. EVA Air added Asahikawa as a destination from Taipei on May 2, 2013.

Rail
Asahikawa is one of the major rail hubs of Hokkaido. The Hakodate Main Line connects Asahikawa to Hakodate in the south of Hokkaido, and the Sōya Main Line connects Asahikawa with Wakkanai at the north of Hokkaido. The Sekihoku Main Line connects the city with Abashiri on the Sea of Okhotsk. The Furano Line connects Abashiri with nearby Biei and Furano.
JR Hokkaido
Hakodate Main Line：- Asahikawa–Chikabumi
Sōya Main Line：- Asahikawa–Asahikawa-Yojō–Shin-Asahikawa–Nagayama–Kita-Nagayama
Sekihoku Main Line：- Shin-Asahikawa–Minami-Nagayama–Higashi-Asahikawa–Sakuraoka
Furano Line: Asahikawa–Kaguraoka–Midorigaoka–Nishi-Goryō–Nishi-Mizuho–Nishi-Kagura–Nishi-Seiwa–Chiyogaoka

Bus
Municipal buses also serve the city.

Specialties
 Asahikawa Ramen
 Asahikawa furniture
 Confectionery
 Sake (Otokoyama, Takasago, Taisetsunokura)
 Taisetsu Microbrew Beer "Taisetsu ji-beer"
 Asahikawa mutton barbecue "Genghis Khan"
 Asahikawa pork barbecue "Shio-Horumon"
 Asahikawa chickein barbecue "Shinko-yaki"
 Pottery/wooden handiwork (Arashiyama area)
 Sushi and Seafood

Sightseeing

 Asahiyama Zoo
 Ski Resorts (Kamui Ski Links, Santa Present Park, Pippu Ski Area, Canmore Ski Village etc.) - "Hokkaido Powder Belt"
 Ueno Farm (Hokkaido Garden Path)
 Asahikawa Winter Festival/Illuminations (February)
 Asahikawa Station Building
 Arashiyama Pottery village
 Asahibashi Bridge
 Asahikawa Furniture Center
 Asahikawa Kitasaito Garden
 Asahikawa Museum of Sculpture in Honor of Teijiro Nakahara
 Asahikawa Youth Science Museum "Saiparu"
 Ayako Miura Memorial Literature Center
 Hoppo Wild Flower Garden, famous for Erythronium japonicum (Dogtooth violet) that flower in May
 Hokkaido Traditional Art Craft Village
 Kamikawa Shrine
 Mount Tossho, also famous for Erythronium japonicum
 Otokoyama Sake Brewing Museum
 Romantic Road (tree tunnel and churches)
 Yasushi Inoue Memorial Center

Mascots

Asappy is a mixture of a harbor seal and a polar bear. He wears a shirt designed after Daisetsuzan National Park with fringes that resembled ramen, his belt is designed after the Asahi Bridge and his pants were designed after the Ishikari River. His red scarf shows his status as a hero.
Yukkirin is a strong but kind snow giraffe (technically a kirin). Her dress has an apple, a snowflake and a flower motif. She wears Etanbetsu boots with fringes. Her antenna resembles snowballs, she can use them to gather information.

Sister and friendship cities

Sister cities
 Bloomington, Illinois, United States 
 Normal, Illinois, United States
 Suwon, Gyeonggi-do, South Korea

Friendship cities
 Yuzhno-Sakhalinsk, Sakhalin Oblast, Russia
 Harbin, Heilongjiang, China

Notable people

 Takeshi Aono, voice actor
 Miura Ayako, author
 Haruhisa Chiba, skier
 Yuko Emoto, judo wrestler
 Kazuhiro Fujita, manga artist
 Nanami Hashimoto, idol
 Yasushi Inoue, author
 Kiyomi Kato, wrestler
 Kitanofuji Katsuaki, sumo wrestler
 Shigeo Nakata, wrestler
 Ikumi Narita, volleyball player
 Victor Starffin, baseball player
 Taizō Sugimura, politician
 Bikki Sunazawa, sculptor and painter
 Kentaro Suzuki, football player
 Koyo Takahashi, basketball player
 Tomoka Takeuchi, snowboarder
 Kōji Tamaki, lead vocalist of Anzen Chitai
 Buichi Terasawa, manga artist
 Masae Ueno, judo wrestler
 Yoshie Ueno, judo wrestler
 Miho Yabe, actress
 Megumi Yabushita, mixed martial artist, kickboxer, professional wrestler and judoka
 Shōgō Yasumura, comedian

References

External links

 Official Website 
 Asahikawa Tourism Website 
 Asahikawa Winter Festival

 
Cities in Hokkaido